Redstone Creek is a stream in Clark, Kingsbury, Miner and Sanborn counties in the U.S. state of South Dakota.

Redstone Creek was named for the reddish tint of the rock within its watercourse.

See also
List of rivers of South Dakota

References

Rivers of Clark County, South Dakota
Rivers of Kingsbury County, South Dakota
Rivers of Miner County, South Dakota
Rivers of Sanborn County, South Dakota
Rivers of South Dakota